Jollification is the third album by English rock band the Lightning Seeds. All songs were written by Ian Broudie, with contributions on some tracks from Alison Moyet, Ian McNabb and Terry Hall.

Four tracks from the album were released as singles in the UK: "Lucky You", "Marvellous", "Change" and "Perfect". It peaked at number 12 in the UK Albums Chart, and gained platinum certification in December 1995.

Background
In 1989 Ian Broudie began recording alone under the name Lightning Seeds and achieved success with the psychedelic and synthpop hit "Pure", from the album Cloudcuckooland, which reached the UK Top 20. The same year "Joy" and "All I Want" were also released but failed to make an impression. "Pure" had some success in the United States Billboard Top 40, reaching No. 32. Both "Pure" and "All I Want" also reached the Modern Rock Tracks top 10. In 1991 Broudie returned to song-writing and moved labels from Rough Trade to Virgin.

Writing and recording
By the end of 1993, Broudie had completed the third Lightning Seeds album Jollification, which included contributions from Terry Hall, Simon Rogers, Alison Moyet and Ian McNabb. A promotional tour began in August 1994 with their line-up consisting of, guitarist Paul Hemmings, drummer Chris Sharrock, bassist Martyn Campbell and keyboardist Ali Kane. The tour benefited from the success of the second single from the album "Change", which reached No. 13 in the UK Singles Chart, becoming Lightning Seeds' second UK top twenty hit. The album Jollification became a critical success and the other singles taken from this album ("Lucky You", "Marvellous" and "Perfect") all made noticeable impact. Mark Farrow's album cover featured the use of computer graphics to create an enormous strawberry and depicting seeds with superimposed human faces.

Release and reception

Jollification was released in the UK on 5 September 1994 and in the US on 20 December 1994. Jason Damas for AllMusic felt that the album is "occasionally too produced", but called it Broudie's "strongest batch of songs yet".

Track listing
All songs written by Ian Broudie (except where stated).
 "Perfect" – 3:28
 "Lucky You" – 4:20 (Broudie, Terry Hall)
 "Open Goals" (sample by Aaron Neville, George Porter Jr., Joseph Modeliste, Leo Nocentelli) - 3:49
 "Change" – 4:03
 "Why Why Why" – 4:14
 "Marvellous" – 5:31
 "Feeling Lazy" – 3:55 (Broudie, Ian McNabb)
 "My Best Day" – 5:00 (Broudie, Alison Moyet)
 "Punch & Judy" – 3:17
 "Telling Tales" – 2:52

"Open Goals" contains a sample from "Look-Ka Py Py" as recorded by The Meters.

Personnel

The Lightning Seeds
 Ian Broudie – vocals, all instruments, producer
 Simon Rogers – all instruments, producer

Production
 Cenzo Townshend – engineer
 David Bascombe – mixing
 Bob Ludwig – mastering

Additional musicians
 Clive Layton – Hammond organ, piano
 Marina Van-Rooy – vocals on "Why Why Why"
 Alison Moyet – vocals on "My Best Day", backing vocals
 Terry Hall – backing vocals
 Ian McNabb – backing vocals
 Carl Brown – backing vocals
 Simon Fowler – backing vocals

Other personnel
 Mark Farrow – design
 Debra Burley – co-ordination
Andy Earl - photography

Charts

Weekly charts

Year-end charts

Singles

Certifications
 United Kingdom (BPI): Silver (1 July 1995), Gold (1 August 1995), Platinum (1 December 1995)

References

1994 albums
The Lightning Seeds albums
Albums produced by Ian Broudie
Epic Records albums